François Flameng (1856–1923) was a notable French painter during the last quarter of the 19th century and the first quarter of the 20th. He was the son of Léopold Flameng, a celebrated printmaker, and received a first-rate education in his craft.

Work
Flameng initially received renown for his history painting and portraiture, and became a professor at the Academy of Fine Arts.  He decorated such important civic buildings as the Sorbonne and the Opera Comique, and also produced advertising work.  Flameng was granted France's highest civilian honor, the Legion d'Honneur, and designed France's first bank notes.  He was also made an honorary Commander of the Royal Victorian Order in the 1908 Birthday Honours.

Flameng later received renown for his painting of World War I.  He was named honorary president of the Society of Military Painters and an accredited documenter for the War Ministry. His work was displayed in the Hôtel des Invalides in Paris, as well as being reproduced in newsmagazines. At the time they were painted,  Flameng's war paintings were derided by many critics for being too realistic and not including heroic drama (although his paintings seem romantic to eyes which have seen photographs of genocide and nuclear war).

Most of his war paintings were donated to the Musée de l'Armée in 1920. In 1919 he was elected into the National Academy of Design as an Honorary Corresponding Academician.

Marriage, family and friends

Flameng married Marguerite Henriette Augusta Turquet (1863–?) at Neuilly-sur-Seine on 30 November 1881. Their daughter Marie married the tennis star Max Decugis, whom Flameng also painted.

François Flameng was a friend of John Singer Sargent, who painted his portrait, he also traveled with Jean-Léon Gérôme and Victor Clairin in Italy, and tutored Paul-Émile Bécat.

Gallery

Works
Flameng's portraits include:
Family Portrait of a Boy and His Two Sisters
Fashionable Beauty
Portrait of a Girl Holding Her Two Toy Elephants
Portrait of Auguste Rodin
Two portraits of Princess Zinaida Yusupova in Arkhangelskoye
Portrait of Elsie Salomon Duveen, wife of the art dealer Joseph Duveen, an oval in the Ferens Art Gallery, Kingston-upon-Hull.
 Portrait of Queen Alexandra, consort of King Edward VII, full-length seated, in the White Drawing Room at Buckingham Palace.

Flameng's history paintings included:
The Carnival, Venice
Court Ladies Bathing in the 18th century
Grolier in the House of Aldus (at Grolier Club in New York)
Molière Demanding an Audience With King Louis XIV at Versailles
Napoléon Studying Military History
Reception at Malmaison, 1802

Paintings of the first world war include:
A Machine Gun Company of Chasseurs Alpins in the Barren Winter Landscape of the Vosges
The Battle of the Yser in 1914
The Donkey, Somme, 1916
The Forgotten Front
Heavy Artillery on the Railway, October 1916

References

External links

The Landscapes of War - page with a gallery of war paintings of François Flameng

1856 births
1923 deaths
19th-century French painters
French male painters
20th-century French painters
20th-century French male artists
Academic staff of the Académie Julian
Honorary Commanders of the Royal Victorian Order
Members of the Académie des beaux-arts
19th-century painters of historical subjects
19th-century French male artists